Münsters fall, also known as Münster's Case, is a Swedish thriller film directed by Richard Petrelius.

The lead roles were played by Sven Wollter, Eva Rexed, and Thomas Hanzon. In the movie, Sven Wollter played the role of a lawman and investigated the death of a wealthy wine merchant.

The film is direct to video, and the Swedish DVD premiere was released on December 14, 2005.

References 

2005 films
2000s Swedish-language films
2000s Swedish films